The Down Troddence, popularly known as TDT is a six piece thrash metal band, originally from Kannur district in Kerala, India. The band consists of Munz (Vocals), Varun Raj (Guitar), Nezer Ahemed (Bass Guitar, Backing Vocals), Sushin Shyam (Keyboards, Backing Vocals), Ganesh Radhakrishnan (Drums), and Advaith Mohan (Guitar). The band released its debut album titled How Are You? We Are Fine, Thank You on 1 January 2014 to positive reviews.
It was produced by Keshav Dhar (Skyharbor) at Illusion Audio, New Delhi.

History

Band formation
The band started off as a two-man studio project by Varun and Munz in 2008, called Ultimatyum. After roping in Sushin (who had collaborated with Varun on a previous project called 25 Aug), Prayag (drums), Rinoy Balan (guitars), and Shaib (bass), The Down Troddence as a full-fledged band became a reality. Due to the departure of Shaib due to personal reasons, Nezer came in to take over bass duties. Following the release of their first single "Death Vanity", Prayag was replaced by Ganesh (previously with progressive metal band Purple Blood) on drums.

The band got its first big boost with the release of the music video for their single "Shiva". The video received the Best Music Video award at the IndieGo South Asian Music Awards. Following a series of victories at college fests in and around South India, the band went on a short hiatus during which time the various band members shifted base to other cities. Munz, Nezer and Ganesh shifted to Bangalore, while Sushin moved to Chennai to work as the studio programmer for famed South Indian music director Deepak Dev. At this juncture, Rinoy also departed the band and was replaced by Advaith Mohan (of Chennai-based band Iterate), who is also based in Bangalore.

Debut album
The band had already released three singles independently before 2012, and wanted to work on a full-fledged debut album. By mid October 2012, pre-production work on nine tracks had been completed, and Keshav Dhar of Skyharbor fame, agreed to produce the album. Tracking was done in Bangalore during November. After a long wait of almost a year, the debut album titled How Are You? We Are Fine, Thank You was released at Counterculture, Bangalore on New Year's Eve, 2014. The digital version of the album has gone on to become the top-seller on Oklisten.com in the span of 5 days.

Awards and major performances
Some of the major achievements of the band are listed below:-
 Best Band – Critic's Choice – Rolling Stones India Metal Awards 2014
 Best Band – Popular Choice – Rolling Stones India Metal Awards 2014
 Best Song (Nagavalli) – Critic's Choice – Rolling Stones India Metal Awards 2014
 Best Song (Nagavalli) – Popular Choice – Rolling Stones India Metal Awards 2014
 Best Album (How are you? We are fine. Thank you) – Critic's Choice – Rolling Stones India Metal Awards 2014
 Best Album (How are you? We are fine. Thank you) – Popular Choice – Rolling Stones India Metal Awards 2014
 Best Artwork (Abhijith VB) – Rolling Stones India Metal Awards 2014
 Best Music Video Award (Shiva) – IndieGo South Asia Music Awards 2011
 Best Vocalist Award (Munz) – IndieGo South Asia Music Awards 2011
 Best Instrumental (Ortniavis) – IndieGo South Asia Music Awards 2011
 Opened for UK Based band Cypher 16 in Bangalore (2011)
 Best Keyboardist (Sushin) – Decibels Semi-Pro Band Competition (Saarang 2012)
 Best Band – Festember 2012

Musical style and influences
TDT has always been noted for its unique blend of conventional thrash and groove metal with a large dose of traditional Kerala folk music elements, art forms such as Theyyam in particular. The band also incorporates a lot of traditional folk sounds and instruments in the form of ambient layers in their music. Rhythm structures used in their songs too are primarily inspired by folk music.

Lyrically the band has a strong philosophy of talking about inequalities and injustices which are ever present in India's social and political systems. A common theme in their music is the effort to project the voice of the under-privileged and down-trodden people.
Another big influence on the band has been the Malayalam Folk Rock band Avial, who also speak about similar themes in their music.

Band members

Current members
 Munz – vocals (2009–present)
 Varun Raj – guitar (2009–present)
 Sushin Shyam – keyboards, backing vocals (2009–present)
 Nezer Ahemed – bass, backing vocals (2009–present)
 Ganesh Radhakrishnan – drums (2010–present)
 Advaith Mohan – guitar (2012–present)

Former members
 Rinoy Balan – guitar (2009–2012)
 Prayag MP – drums (2009–2009)
 Shaib – bass (2009–2009)

See also
Indian rock
Kryptos (band)
Bhayanak Maut
Nicotine (band)
Inner Sanctum (band)
Scribe (band)
Demonic Resurrection

References

External links 
 http://bitemymusic.com/full-list-of-indiego-winners/
 http://www.indianmusicrevolution.com/Interviews/Interview-MunzThe-Down-Troddence.html
 http://www.highonscore.com/the-down-troddence-release-their-debut-video
 http://www.headbangers.in/blog/the-down-troddence-release-debut-album-at-metal-factory-bangalore/
 http://timesofindia.indiatimes.com/entertainment/malayalam/music/The-Down-Troddence-bags-eight-awards/articleshow/37076197.cms

Indian heavy metal musical groups
Music bands from Kerala
Musical groups established in 2008
Thrash metal musical groups